is a Japanese professional basketball player who plays for the Ehime Orange Vikings of the B.League in Japan. He is the first and only Japanese bj leaguer that acquired the regular season MVP award.

Career statistics

Regular season 

|-
| align="left" | 2005-06
| align="left" |Osaka
| 33 ||  || 28.4 || .363 || .350 || .730 || 3.3 || 1.2 || 1.0 || 0.0 ||  8.7
|-
| align="left" | 2006-07
| align="left" | Osaka
| 36 ||  || 18.3 || .389 || .376 || .714 || 1.4 || 1.0 || 0.5 || 0.1 ||  6.7
|-
| align="left" | 2007-08
| align="left" | Tokyo Apache
| 41 ||  || 17.1 || .379 || .346 || .786 || 1.6 || 1.7 || 0.8 || 0.1 ||  7.6
|-
| align="left" |  2008-09
| align="left" | Tokyo Apache
| 51 || 43 || 25.5 || .338 || .298 || .707 || 2.7 || 2.2 || 1.4 || 0.1 || | 10.0
|-
| align="left" |  2009-10
| align="left" | Shiga
| 52 || 48 || 31.9 || .370 || .298 || .731 || 2.8 || 1.9 || 1.3 || 0.1 || 15.0
|-
| align="left" |  2010-11
| align="left" | Shiga
| 50 || 50 || 27.0 || .410 || .342 || .744 || 2.2 || 1.7 || 1.0 || 0.1 ||  13.1
|-
| align="left" |  2011-12
| align="left" | Toyama
| 48 || 48 || 36.7 || .381 || .327 || .759 || 4.1 || 3.1 || 1.8 || 0.0 ||  15.3
|-
| align="left" |  2012-13
| align="left" | Toyama
| 49 || 49 || 31.8 || .385 || .292 || .723 || 3.6 || 3.6 || 1.6 || 0.1 ||  13.7
|-
| align="left" |  2013-14
| align="left" | Toyama
| 52 || 52 || 33.4 || .399 || .349 || .802 || 3.6 || 3.7 || 1.3 || 0.0 || 17.4
|-
| align="left" | 2014-15
| align="left" | Toyama
| 45 || 45 || 32.0|| .380|| .368|| .770|| 3.2|| 3.4|| 1.5|| 0.2|| 16.7
|-
| align="left" |  2015-16
| align="left" | Toyama
| 52 || 52 || 32.0 || .423 || .347|| .789|| 3.2|| 3.9|| 1.4|| 0.0|| 17.1
|-

Personal 

He tied the knot to tarento Mayu Nagao in 2015.

References

1982 births
Living people
Japanese men's basketball players
Niigata Albirex BB players
Osaka Evessa players
Tokyo Apache players
Rizing Zephyr Fukuoka players
Shiga Lakes players
Toyama Grouses players
Ehime Orange Vikings players
Earth Friends Tokyo Z players
Sportspeople from Hokkaido
Shooting guards